Martin Lee Truex Jr. (born June 29, 1980) is an American professional stock car racing driver. He competes full-time in the NASCAR Cup Series, driving the No. 19 Toyota Camry for Joe Gibbs Racing. He is the 2017 Monster Energy NASCAR Cup Series champion and a two-time Xfinity Series champion, having won two consecutive championships in 2004 and 2005.

Many members of Truex Jr.'s family are current or retired NASCAR drivers. His younger brother Ryan competes part-time in the NASCAR Xfinity Series for Joe Gibbs Racing and Sam Hunt Racing, and is a two-time consecutive champion in what is now known as the ARCA Menards Series East. His father Martin Sr. competed full-time in the East Series in the 1990s. His uncle Barney competed part-time in the Whelen Modified Tour in the 1980s. His cousins, Curtis Truex Jr. and Tyler Truex, are late model racing drivers.

Early career

The son of racer Martin Truex Sr., Martin Jr. began his racing career driving go-karts at the New Egypt Speedway, located in Central New Jersey when it was still a paved track (the track was later switched to dirt). Truex Jr. would make his move to the Modified division at Wall Stadium in 1998, as soon as he was old enough to race a car at the age of 18 (under New Jersey regulations).

In 2000, Truex moved south and rented a home from Dale Earnhardt Jr. in Mooresville, North Carolina, eventually purchasing his own home there. Following in his father's footsteps, he began racing in the Busch North Series. He ran three full seasons (2000 to 2002) and made limited starts in 2003. Truex claimed 13 poles and 5 wins driving his family-owned No. 56 SeaWatch Chevy.

NASCAR

2001–2005: Busch Series

Truex made his first Busch Series start in 2001 at Dover International Speedway in his father's No. 56 Chevy. He started 19th but finished 38th after an early wreck. In 2002, Truex drove one race for Phoenix Racing at New Hampshire International Speedway, starting 13th and finishing 29th. He ran three races the rest of that season for his father, his best finish seventeenth at Dover.

In 2003, he began the season with his father's team, before he was hired by Dale Earnhardt Jr. to drive his No. 81 Chance 2 Motorsports Chevy. He made his debut with Chance 2 at Richmond International Raceway, where he qualified sixth and led 11 laps before transmission failure forced him to a 31st-place finish. He split time between Chance 2 and his father's team for the balance of the season, except at Dover, where he drove for Stanton Barrett. He had a sixth-place run at Bristol Motor Speedway, and ended the season with two consecutive second-place finishes. He ran a total of ten races that season.

Truex raced full-time for Chance 2 in 2004. At Bristol Motor Speedway, he would earn his first career victory, and he would later add three more victories over the next seven races. This would include a victory at Talladega Superspeedway which broke his car owner's streak of winning restrictor plate races in the Busch Series, and a victory at the final NASCAR event held at Nazareth Speedway. He took the lead in the championship after Nazareth but lost it to rookie Kyle Busch a few races later. However, a series of Top 5's and Top 10's in the second half of the season would allow Truex to pull away from Busch, clinching the Busch Series championship with a race to spare.

While on his way to that championship, Truex made an appearance in the Nextel Cup Series as a relief driver to Dale Earnhardt Jr., who'd suffered burns in a sports car accident. Truex started his first career Cup race for Dale Earnhardt, Inc. (DEI) in the No. 1 at Atlanta Motor Speedway later that year, qualifying 33rd and finishing 37th.

Truex stayed in the Busch Series to defend his championship in 2005, winning the title for the second season in a row. He won the first Busch Series points race held outside the United States, in Mexico, as well as defending his wins at Talladega and Dover International Speedway. He took his first win at Daytona International Speedway on July 1, 2005.

2006–2008: Dale Earnhardt, Inc.

In 2006, Truex moved to the No. 1 DEI Chevy full-time in the Nextel Cup Series. He had two Top 5 finishes and finished 19th in points. Truex got his first win of the 2007 season in the NASCAR Nextel All-Star Open, securing a spot in the 2007 Nextel All-Star Challenge, where he finished tenth.

A few weeks later, he won the Autism Speaks 400, scoring his first Sprint Cup Series win with an interval of seven seconds between pole-sitter Ryan Newman and himself, even though he led over half of the race—219 of the 400 laps.

This victory led to a jump in overall points advancing him to 13th, followed by a third-place finish at Pocono Raceway and a second-place finish at Michigan. With a 15th-place finish in the Chevy Rock and Roll 400, Truex clinched a spot in his first Chase for the Sprint Cup and finished 11th in points at season's end. He did not go to victory lane in 2008, but he did have 11 Top 10's and finished 15th in the points standings.

2009: Earnhardt Ganassi Racing
At the beginning of the 2009 season, Dale Earnhardt, Inc. merged into Chip Ganassi Racing and was renamed Earnhardt-Ganassi Racing with Felix Sabates. The move was in effect a closing of DEI, and Truex's No. 1 moved to Ganassi to replace the defunct No. 41 of Reed Sorenson. Truex began the year by winning the pole for the Daytona 500. Later in the season, Truex had claimed two more pole positions at Atlanta and Phoenix, following his first pole since 2007 at Texas.

2009 would be Truex Jr.'s lone season with Earnhardt Ganassi Racing, as he departed following the season and was replaced by Jamie McMurray.

2010–2013: Michael Waltrip Racing

2010–2011

After the 2009 season, Truex left Earnhardt Ganassi Racing to drive the No. 56 Toyota Camry for Michael Waltrip Racing, receiving owner points from the No. 55 car formerly driven by Waltrip. The No. 56 was the number Martin's father drove in during his time in the Grand National Division and is considered the "family number". In his first race for Michael Waltrip Racing, Truex finished sixth in the Daytona 500.

After the series of setbacks the following three weeks with a blown engine and accidents, he fell back to 24th in the point standings, but in the next seven races after finishing in the Top 12 fives times and all Top 19 finishes, he would gain to 13th in the point standings. At Dover, he earned his fifth career pole. Truex won the All-Star Showdown at Charlotte thereby earning the 1st transfer spot for the All-Star Race which he finished second in from a 19th (out of 21) starting spot. Truex would go on to finish the 2010 season 22nd in the point standings with one Top 5 finish and seven Top 10 finishes.

At Martinsville the following year in 2011, a stuck throttle caused Truex to make contact with Kasey Kahne, resulting in a large wreck; Truex hit the wall hard head-on and his car flew on fire for a few seconds as Kahne hit the wall in his car's rear. Truex climbed out instantly and went to check on Kahne who received a standing ovation as he climbed out uninjured. Truex then left with officials to the care center. He said the wreck was the hardest of his career and both Truex and Kahne were released with normal symptoms. The next week officials told him his wreck was the hardest crash at Martinsville. Truex won another pole at Dover International Raceway.  Truex ran well in most of the races but often struggled to finish the races off.  He was docked 25 points because of a windshield violation in the fall Talladega race. He ended the season 18th in points, with three Top 5's and 12 top 10's.

2012
Truex started 2012 well, winning a $200,000 bonus and finishing 7th in the Daytona 500. He finally hit his stride in Texas, winning the pole and leading 69 laps. The following week at Kansas he started sixth and flat-out dominated the race, leading 173 of 267 laps but falling short to Denny Hamlin. At Atlanta, he led 40 of the final 46 laps, but ultimately fell short to Hamlin again when he was forced to pit under a late-race caution for fuel, ending up fourth. Truex finished 21st, however, he had a spot clinched in the Chase, and ultimately made it in. He ended up 11th in the points, with zero wins, seven Top 5's, and 19 Top 10's.

2013

Truex had an up and down 2013 season. He had a few top-five finishes in the early races. His first best run of 2013 was Texas, when he led during the final 55 laps of the race but ended up losing to Kyle Busch. Truex also had low notes, including an accident at Martinsville and a blown engine at Dover. The highlight of the season was at Sonoma, when Truex broke a 218 race winless streak, starting 14th on the starting grid and working his way up to win by over eight seconds over Jeff Gordon. Truex's 218-race winless streak is second only to Bill Elliott, who went winless in 226 races between 1994 and 2001. It is only the second time a car numbered No. 56 won in NASCAR's highest division, the first being Jim Hurtubise in a 1966 Atlanta race.

Returning to Bristol, Truex was involved in a wreck on Lap 448 where his car hit an inside wall at an angle that he broke his right wrist; he continued racing despite wearing a cast on his right wrist. At Atlanta, despite nursing a broken wrist, Truex finished third to Kyle Busch and Joey Logano.

In the final regular-season race at Richmond, Truex was in the midst of a fierce battle for the final Wildcard spot, eventually coming out over Ryan Newman by a tiebreaker. As Newman and Truex each had one win, the Wildcard spot went to Truex, for having a better number of top-five finishes than Newman; however on Monday evening, it was announced that due to MWR having attempted to manipulate the results of the race, points penalties were assessed – 50 points for Truex, Clint Bowyer and Brian Vickers each – that resulted in Truex being bumped from the Chase and Newman and Jeff Gordon being added to the Chase field, as well as probation for all 3 crew chiefs, suspension of Ty Norris, and a $300,000 fine. In the final 10 races of the season, Truex had 4 top 10 finishes, which included a top 5 run at Homestead-Miami Speedway.

2014–2018: Furniture Row Racing

2014

On October 14, 2013, it was announced that Michael Waltrip Racing's No. 56 would become a research and development team in 2014, and later was spun off. Truex was told he could offer his services as a driver to other teams, and on October 17 it was confirmed that for the 2014 NASCAR Sprint Cup Series season Truex would move to Furniture Row Racing and drive the No. 78 Chevrolet being vacated by Kurt Busch. When the deal was formally announced on November 1, 2013, before the Texas race, it was announced that Furniture Row had also signed on all of the members of Truex's MWR pit crew.

Truex's 2014 season started with an outside pole qualifying run for the Daytona 500, Furniture Row Racing's first front row start in the 500. However, Truex's engine failed on lap 31.

Truex did poorly in the spring but rebounded with 4 top tens in the latter part of the season. He only led a single lap (at Talladega in the October race) and finished 24th in the final points.

2015: 1st Championship Four Appearance

Before the 2015 season, crew chief Todd Berrier was released and replaced with rookie crew chief Cole Pearn.

Truex's season began on a high note. He led the most laps of the Sprint Unlimited (28 of 75). He led late but after a late-race red flag period erased his 5-second lead on Joey Logano, Truex lost his rhythm and finished second to Matt Kenseth. In a post-race interview, an emotional Truex said "We needed this. The race was over once Kenseth pulled away from me. But we needed this. After the last year and a half that I've had this satisfies a lot."

Truex continued his good momentum, finishing in the top ten in 14 of the first 15 races including a runner-up at Las Vegas. His only poor finish during this period was a 29th-place finish at Bristol, seven laps down, after being swept up in a late-race accident. At Kansas, Truex led the most laps (95), but a late caution killed his chances as he slipped back to 9th on the last restart, and he was unable to make up enough ground to catch Jimmie Johnson.

At the Coca-Cola 600, Truex led the most laps (131 of 400), but with 20 laps to go, he had to make a late-race fuel stop and finished 5th. At Dover, Truex led the most laps again (131 of 405), but a poor restart caused him to slide back to seventh and cost him the race to Johnson.

At Pocono, Truex started third, and ran up front for most of the race, leading 97 of 160 laps. On the last restart, he managed to pull away to a 1.8-second lead on Kevin Harvick to take the checkered flag in first place. For Truex, this snapped a 69 race winless streak and was also the fourth straight points race in which he led the most laps. It was the second win for Furniture Row Racing and the first for crew chief Cole Pearn.

With a third-place finish in a rain-shortened Michigan race, Truex became the first driver since Richard Petty in 1969 to start a Cup season with 14 top-10 finishes through the first 15 races. At Sonoma, Truex was running in the top 20 until shortly after the first restart, when David Ragan turned him in the esses, which saw Truex crash into a jersey barrier, resulting in a 42nd-place finish. At Daytona, Truex was running up front until he was caught up in a crash on lap 106, relegating him to a 38th-place finish. Despite a string of bad races, Truex nonetheless made the Chase for the Sprint Cup and advanced through the first 2 rounds of the Chase. He also advanced to the final four at Homestead-Miami and went on to finish 4th in the final standings, a then-career best for both FRR and Truex.

2016

Prior to the season, Furniture Row switched manufacturers from Chevrolet to Toyota. Bass Pro Shops signed on as an associate sponsor to the No. 78, reuniting with Truex for the first time since Truex's time with DEI. Truex started the 2016 season qualifying 28th for the Daytona 500 and ran up front for most of the day. On the last lap of the Daytona 500, he was positioned behind race leader Matt Kenseth. Heading into turn 3 Denny Hamlin got a big run on Kenseth and tried to pass him but Matt went up to block Hamlin but nearly wrecked in the process and ended up losing the draft leaving Truex as the leading car. After a ferocious race to the finish line, Truex lost by 0.010 seconds to Denny Hamlin in the closest Daytona 500 finish in history.

Truex dominated at Texas, leading 141 of 334 laps but lost after not making a pit stop with less than 39 laps to go. At Kansas in May, Truex won his first pole of the year and first pole in 147 races in Sprint Cup for the running of the Go Bowling 400. Truex led a race-high 172 laps but a loose wheel relegated him to a 14th-place finish. He won his second pole of the season for the Coca-Cola 600. On May 29—Sunday of Memorial Day weekend, 2016—Truex dominated, leading a record 392 of 400 laps in the Coca-Cola 600 at Charlotte Motor Speedway, surpassing the old record of 335 laps set by Jim Paschal in 1967. The win was Truex's first of 2016, clinching a place in the Chase for the Sprint Cup at the end-of-season. He led the race for 588 miles, the most miles led by any driver in any NASCAR race ever.

On September 4, in the Bojangles' Southern 500 at Darlington Raceway, Truex won his second race of the year. With 20 laps to go Truex Jr. was on point with Kevin Harvick and Kyle Larson chasing from behind. With 19 laps to go Harvick and Larson found themselves five seconds behind the leader when a caution came out for a hard wreck by Aric Almirola in the No. 43 machine. With 17 laps to go the field hit pit road for the final time with Truex Jr. winning the battle off pit road. The final restart came with 12 laps to go and immediately Harvick and Larson battled quickly before Harvick eventually took second and then set sail to catch Truex. Luckily For Truex, however, Harvick could not match the number 78 car and Truex would go on to win the Southern 500.

2016 became the first multi-win season of his career. Truex would advance to the next round of the Chase at Chicagoland. Truex led 32 of the final 50 laps and appeared set to finish second behind Chase Elliott. After a caution with 10 laps left erased Elliott's 3-second lead, Truex and Elliott pitted. Truex used the advantage of his fresh tires and got by rookie Ryan Blaney on the final restart, winning the race, his third win of the season. At New Hampshire, Truex had a great car all day and would lead the most laps but towards the end, his tires would wear, and a few late-race cautions came out so he would lose the lead, eventually, Kevin Harvick would win and Truex would finish 7th.

The next week, coming back to Dover, Truex would once again have a great car and would lead the most laps, and would get his 4th win of the season and 7th win of his career after the other dominant driver Jimmie Johnson had a pit road mistake and would be advanced into round 2 of the Chase after his Chicagoland win.  He would eventually get eliminated in the Round of 12 after his engine blew up in the elimination race at Talladega and some poor performances in the Round of 12.

2017: Championship year

Truex started the 2017 season off by winning the Kobalt 400 at Las Vegas Motor Speedway. This was Toyota's first win of the season with the new 2018 Camry and Truex's first career win at Las Vegas. He also became the first driver to win all three stages of the new stage format that was introduced for 2017.

At Kansas in May 2017, Truex started 4th. The race was primarily a duel between him and Ryan Blaney. Truex held off Blaney, Kevin Harvick, and a hard-charging Brad Keselowski on three restarts to win the race. At Charlotte, he led the most laps once again, becoming only the second man to lead the most laps in three straight Coca-Cola 600 races, yet only winning one. He tied Darrell Waltrip's record. At Michigan, he won 2 more stage wins, becoming the first and fastest person to ever win 10 stage wins, where nobody else has won more than four, or any other team's combined stage wins. In July, Truex captured his third win of the season, dominating the Quaker State 400 at Kentucky Speedway. He again won all three stages, leading 152 of 267 laps. With two laps to go, Truex had a 14-second lead before a late caution set up an overtime finish. Despite each of the other seven cars behind him pitting during the caution, Truex held off Kyle Busch and Kyle Larson on older tires before a wreck behind the lead pack brought out another yellow flag, this one ending the race.

Truex took home his fourth win of the season in August winning the I Love New York 355 at The Glen, capturing his first win at Watkins Glen International Speedway. After finishing 2nd in the first two segments of the race, Truex took the lead with 36 laps to go from Brad Keselowski but relinquished the top two spots to Keselowski and Ryan Blaney to save fuel. The strategy paid off, as Keselowski went to pit road with five laps remaining, while Blaney went one lap later, giving Truex the lead. He was able to make it to the finish, holding off Matt Kenseth as he was running out of fuel for his second career road course victory. It was an emotional win for the #78 team, as Pollex returned to victory lane with Truex after missing the Kentucky win due to a cancer recurrence, while his crew chief Cole Pearn helped earn the win while coping with the loss of his best friend, Jacob Damen.

Two races later at the 2017 Bass Pro Shops NRA Night Race at Bristol Motor Speedway, Truex had a chance to clinch the first regular-season title in NASCAR history if he left with a points lead of 120 points or greater. However, Truex struggled during the early stages of the race and finished 21st

Following an off-week, Truex raced in the Bojangles Southern 500 at Darlington with another chance to wrap up the regular season crown a week before the finale at Richmond. In stage one, Truex ran down Kyle Larson with under a lap to go to win his 16th stage of the year. The exciting finish earned him his 35th playoff point of the season. After being behind both Larson and Denny Hamlin early in the second stage, Truex was able to find the lead and took the stage victory under caution after an accident occurred with three laps to go. The stage win also clinched Truex the regular-season championship and the additional 15 playoff points that go with the title. Truex seemed to have optimal timing again near the finish, springing to the lead shortly after the final exchange of pit stops in the closing 102-lap run of green-flag racing. However, Denny Hamlin gradually chopped into the lead, setting up a potential classic contest for the lead. With three laps to go, Truex's tire gave way, allowing Hamlin to scoot by and grab his second win of the season. Despite this, Truex clinched the regular-season championship.

Before being awarded the regular-season championship at Richmond, Truex dominated the Federated Auto Parts 400 leading 50% of the race. However, his race derailed when Denny Hamlin wrecked him on the final restart. Truex, though clinching the regular-season championship, expressed discontent with the 1990 Daytona 500 champion, Derrike Cope who caused a caution that changed the outcome of the race, leading up to the wreck. The regular-season championship was Truex's first top-level championship in his Cup Series career.

Truex started the playoffs on a high note, winning the first race of the playoffs, and his 5th win of the season at Chicagoland Speedway despite a pit road speeding penalty early in the race. That win, allowed Truex to secure a spot for the Round of 12. He later earned himself a 5th-place finish at New Hampshire Motor Speedway, although being involved in an 8-car pileup with minor damage midway through the race.

To start the Round of 12, Truex scored his 6th win of the season at Charlotte after leading 91 out of 334 laps to secure a spot for the Round of 8. Just two weeks later, he scored another win at Kansas despite having a restart violation early in the race, that win extends his active win streak in 1.5-mile tracks to 4, a NASCAR record. The next week, Truex came second to Kevin Harvick in Texas Fall race, snapping the streak at the final 1.5. mile track race in the season. After the Texas Chase race, Truex made the final four in the playoffs by points. He ultimately won the final race at Miami, becoming the 2017 champion, and won 19 of 108 stages, capping off one of the most dominant seasons in recent history.

2018: 3rd Championship Four Appearance And Final Year At Furniture Row

Truex started off the season with an 18th-place finish at the 2018 Daytona 500, after being caught up in a late-race wreck. For the next few weeks, Truex picked up top-five finishes for the next five straight races, including two poles, and a win at California. He continued this consistency with wins at Pocono, Sonoma, and Kentucky and 15 top-fives during the regular season. Truex added four top-five finishes during the Playoffs and made the Championship 4 for the second year in a row. He finished second at Homestead to Joey Logano and in the final points standings.

On September 4, 2018, it was announced that Furniture Row Racing will be folding the No. 78 team following the conclusion of the 2018 season. On November 7, 2018, with Furniture Row Racing closing at the end of 2018, it was announced Truex and crew chief Cole Pearn signed a deal with Joe Gibbs Racing to drive the No. 19 starting in the 2019 season, replacing Daniel Suárez and crew chief Dave Rogers.

2019–present: Joe Gibbs Racing

2019: 4th Championship Four Appearance

Truex started his first season with JGR with a 35th-place finish at the 2019 Daytona 500, but he made up for that loss with five straight top-10s and two top-20s before scoring four wins at Richmond (his first Cup win on a short track), Dover, Charlotte, and Sonoma. He began the 2019 playoffs by winning the first two races at Las Vegas and Richmond (his first back-to-back career victories and season "sweep" at Richmond) and advancing to the Round of 12 after finishing seventh at the Charlotte Roval. During the Round of 8, Truex won at Martinsville to secure his position in the Championship 4. At the season finale at Homestead-Miami Speedway, Truex dominated the first half of the race, winning the first stage and leading into green flag pit stops at the midpoint of stage 2. However, the race and championship hope unraveled due to a miscue during the pit stop, in which the left and right front tires were switched around, and installed to the incorrect sides. The pit road error forced an unscheduled stop and rendered Truex a lap down for much of the second stage. He recovered and began to rally back through the field, but could not overcome the loss of track position, ultimately finishing second in the race to teammate Kyle Busch and the final championship standings for the second season in a row. Truex led the series in victories with seven. Truex was also the first driver to lead the series in wins after switching to a new team since Matt Kenseth in 2013, who also did it with Joe Gibbs Racing.

On December 9, after serving as Truex's crew chief for six seasons, Pearn announced he has parted ways with JGR to pursue opportunities outside the sport.

2020
At Martinsville in June, Truex controlled the final 100 laps and won his only race of the season after early-race damage to the front of his car prevented the right-front tire and brake pads from overheating. Truex dominated the final laps of the race at Kentucky but was the victim of a last-lap pass by Cole Custer, the second time in three years that Truex was passed on the final lap by a driver in their first career win. Truex missed the Championship 4 for the first time since 2016 and finished 7th in points.

2021: 5th Championship Four Appearance

Despite only scoring one win in their first season paired together, Truex remained with crew chief James Small, even amidst a crew chief shakeup at JGR that year. He won his first race of the season at Phoenix in March, which was his first victory at the track.

In March, Truex made his return to both the Xfinity Series and the Truck Series. He drove JGR's No. 54 at Atlanta in March for his first Xfinity start since 2010 when he drove multiple races for MWR in their No. 00 and No. 99 cars. Truex drove in the Truck Series' Bristol dirt race in the No. 51 for Kyle Busch Motorsports in preparation for the Cup Series race on the same track, new to the schedule, that weekend. It was his first Truck start since 2006, coincidentally also in the No. 51, but he ran for Billy Ballew Motorsports in 2006. He won the race for his first truck series win, becoming the 36th driver to win in all three top NASCAR Series. Despite leading the most laps (122) at the Cup event, Truex would finish 19th after a cut tire with 2 laps to go while running in third.

Two weeks later, Truex won at Martinsville for the third time in his career, his sixth win on a short track, and became the 1st driver to win multiple races in 2021.

On May 9, Truex dominated and won the Goodyear 400 at Darlington, earning his 30th career victory, and second at the famed track.

At New Hampshire Motor Speedway, Truex was running second when the rain hit the track causing Truex, Kyle Busch and Denny Hamlin to crash. He soon rebounded to finish 12th in the same race, which was shortened due to darkness.

During the rest of the season, he would continue to perform to the best of his ability for the next 3 races after that, earning a 3rd place finish at Watkins Glen International. Truex was involved in a wreck at the Indianapolis Motor Speedway road course late in the race, but managed to finish 15th. He also scored a top 10 at Michigan International Speedway. 

Truex was involved in the big one at the Coke Zero Sugar 400 at Daytona International Speedway, resulting in a 29th-place finish. When the Playoffs started, he scored 1 win at Richmond Raceway, a top 5 at Darlington Raceway, and a top 10 at Bristol Motor Speedway. 

In the second round of the playoffs, he would finish 4th at Las Vegas Motor Speedway, 12th at Talladega Superspeedway, and 29th at the Charlotte Motor Speedway Roval. 

In the final round of the playoffs at Texas Motor Speedway, Truex got loose in turns 3 and 4, snapping the car around and causing him to slam into the outside wall. He would be scored 25th as a result of said crash. However, he would gather enough points and positions in the next two races at Kansas Speedway and Martinsville Speedway, finishing 7th and 4th respectively, giving him just enough points to advance into the Championship 4. 

In the Championship Race at Phoenix Raceway, Truex would be in 1st place for a small portion of the end of the race, looking to secure a second title. With just under 30 laps to go, the caution came out because of David Starr putting debris on the racetrack after cutting a tire. Truex tried his best to overtake the top contender, Kyle Larson, as the laps kept winding down, but ultimately finished 2nd in points after coming up just short of winning. This was the 3rd time in Truex's NASCAR Cup Series career that he has finished 2nd in points.

2022: Championship 4 to Missing the Playoffs

Truex started the 2022 season with a 13th place finish at the 2022 Daytona 500. He was winless through the regular season, but he stayed consistent with three top-fives and 12 top-10 finishes. In June, Truex expressed uncertainty about his future in the NASCAR Cup Series with him debating over if he will retire or stay with JGR.  He would ultimately choose to stay with JGR and run the 2023 season. Despite leading the season in stage wins (7) and being fourth in the regular season standings at the conclusion of the August Daytona race, Truex missed the playoffs for the first time since 2014 after finishing eighth, three points behind Ryan Blaney for the 16th and final playoff spot as Austin Dillon won the race to become the 16th different race winner of the season. Truex went winless and finished 17th in the final standings.

2023
Truex began the 2023 season by winning the 2023 Busch Light Clash at The Coliseum.

Personal life
Truex was born in Trenton, New Jersey, and grew up in the Mayetta section of Stafford Township, New Jersey. He graduated from Southern Regional High School in 1998. His father, Martin Truex Sr., was a former race winner in the Busch North Series. His younger brother, Ryan, is a former champion in the K&N Pro Series East, and was a contender for 2014 Rookie of the Year in Sprint Cup.

Truex and his ex-girlfriend Sherry Pollex were together from 2005-2023. In 2007, they started the Martin Truex Jr. Foundation to support children with pediatric cancer.  In 2014, Pollex was diagnosed with Stage III ovarian cancer. Truex announced that he and Pollex have ended their relationship on January 27, 2023.

In January 2007, Truex was charged with disorderly conduct after being spotted urinating on his car in a public parking garage. Truex, who had been drinking at a bar with members of his team, was fined $100 and issued a public apology.

Truex is an avid fan of the Philadelphia Eagles of the National Football League and the Philadelphia Flyers of the National Hockey League.

In 2019, Truex's holding company, which holds a small aircraft fleet, entered the human organ transport business.

Motorsports career results

NASCAR
(key) (Bold – Pole position awarded by qualifying time. Italics – Pole position earned by points standings or practice time. * – Most laps led. ** – All laps led.)

Cup Series

Daytona 500

Xfinity Series

Camping World Truck Series

Busch North Series

Winston Modified Tour

 Season still in progress 
 Ineligible for series points

International Race of Champions
(key) (Bold – Pole position. * – Most laps led.)

References

External links
 
 

Living people
1980 births
People from Stafford Township, New Jersey
Racing drivers from New Jersey
Southern Regional High School alumni
NASCAR drivers
NASCAR Xfinity Series champions
International Race of Champions drivers
Sportspeople from Ocean County, New Jersey
NASCAR Cup Series champions
Dale Earnhardt Inc. drivers
Michael Waltrip Racing drivers
Joe Gibbs Racing drivers
NASCAR Cup Series regular season champions
Kyle Busch Motorsports drivers
Chip Ganassi Racing drivers
JR Motorsports drivers